Kelvin John Thomson (born 1 May 1955) is a former Australian politician. From March 1996 to May 2016, Thomson was an Australian Labor Party member of the Australian House of Representatives, representing the Division of Wills in Victoria. In February 2013, Thomson was appointed the Parliamentary Secretary for Trade in the Second Gillard Ministry.

Early life
Thomson was born in Coburg, Victoria. He has been active in improving the local environment of Pascoe Vale and north-western Melbourne from a young age. He received a Bachelor of Arts and Bachelor of Laws from the University of Melbourne and, finishing first in his class, he was awarded the Supreme Court Prize for Law.

He joined the Australian Labor Party in 1975 and was a public servant and electorate secretary to Senator Gareth Evans before entering local politics serving as a councillor in the Coburg City Council from 1981 to 1988. He was the deputy mayor from 1983 to 1984 and 1987 to 1988.

Kelvin Thomson was married to Victorian Labor MP Marsha Thomson until they separated in 2003. They have two children.

Politics

State parliament
In October 1988, Thomson was elected to the Victorian Legislative Assembly as the member for the Pascoe Vale. He was a member of the Opposition Shadow Ministry from 1992 to 1994, and in 1994 he served as the Manager of Opposition Business.

Federal parliament
In 1996, Thomson was elected to the seat of Wills, formerly a blue-ribbon Labor seat that had been held by Bob Hawke. However, it had become less safe for Labor. In 1992 the independent Phil Cleary won a by-election; and in 1993, although Labor retained government, Cleary again defeated the Labor candidate who received only 41.9% of the primary vote.  In the 1996 election, in which Labor's support slumped badly and Paul Keating's government was destroyed, Thomson became the Labor candidate and proved himself a strong campaigner. He won the seat, gaining 50.0% of the primary vote. He has held the seat since then. In the 2007 election, which Labor won, Thomson achieved a swing, on the two-party-preferred vote of 5.5 points, and received 56.9% of the primary vote. In the 2010 election, which resulted in near defeat for Labor, Thomson like other Labor incumbents lost ground on the primary vote (51.81%); yet he achieved a further slight positive swing on the two-party preferred vote (0.24%).

In August 1997, Thomson joined the Opposition Shadow Ministry. From 2003 to 2004 he was Shadow Minister for the Environment and Heritage; Shadow Minister for Regional Development and Roads, Housing and Urban Development from 2004 to 2005; and in June 2005 he was appointed Shadow Minister for Public Accountability and Shadow Minister for Human Services. After the election of Kevin Rudd to party leadership in December 2006, Thomson was appointed to the position of Shadow Attorney-General.

On 9 March 2007, Kevin Rudd informed the media that his office had received an anonymous tip-off that back in 2000 Thomson had provided Melbourne gangland figure Tony Mokbel with a personal reference, saying he "understood" Mokbel had been married for the past eight years and also understood that Mokbel had been "a responsible, caring husband and father". It was later revealed by the media that up until 2000, there had been only one mention of Tony Mokbel in the media, a positive article in the Herald Sun about the contributions Mokbel's businesses made to the local economy in Moreland, in and near Thomson's electorate of Wills; and that the National Australia Bank had regarded Mokbel as a legitimate property developer worth some $15 million, in whom they invested until his arrest in August 2001. Thomson resigned from Labor's front bench after the reference became public. He also released the text of the letter, commenting that he did not know Mokbel and that "the reference, as you will be able to see, was more of a pro-forma character (reference)."

The Sydney Morning Herald coverage emphasized that Kevin Rudd was under pressure over "allegations surrounding his past meetings with disgraced former Western Australian premier Brian Burke"; and that Thomson "had no choice but to resign, especially since [Prime Minister] John Howard raised the bar a week ago by sacking Ian Campbell for doing nothing more than the meeting, in his then-capacity as heritage minister, a delegation which included Burke." The same article suggested that the sort of reference Thomson had written was similar to thousands of pro forma references supplied by MPs to their constituents and that it was an open question whether Thomson "would have suffered the same fate" had he not moved, in the seven years since writing the reference, to the position of Shadow Attorney General. It also commented: "Thomson's relegation to the backbench will be a setback for Labor. Ever since December, when Rudd promoted him to shadow attorney-general, he has dealt the Government more grief over David Hicks than Labor did collectively over the previous five years. Of the big changes to Labor's frontbench under Rudd, Thomson was the standout surprise performer."  Thomson was not subsequently re-appointed to the Labor cabinet. He did subsequently chair the Parliament's Treaties Committee and frequently served as acting Speaker.

Since 2009 Thomson's speeches and media releases have often dealt with problems of Australian and global population growth. In August 2009, following a terrorist scare, Thomson attracted controversy with his comments regarding the link between high immigration and allegedly poor screening of immigrants for terrorism. Thomson repeated his call to cut immigration levels in September 2009 following the release of a report indicating that the population of Australia would grow to 35 million by 2049. Thomson said that Australia was "sleepwalking into an environmental disaster", and predicted that such a population would tend to outgrow its resources of "food, water, energy and land".

He has since been an advocate for sustainable population levels in Australia, and in November 2009 proposed a 14 Point Plan for Population Reform. This aims to stabilize Australia's population at 26 million by reducing skilled immigration and cutting the net overseas migration program to 70,000 per annum. The plan would also "abolish the Baby Bonus" but increase the refugee program from 13,750 to 20,000 per annum. (The Labor government has since, in 2012, announced an increase to 20,000.)

Kelvin Thomson describes himself as a keen environmentalist and naturalist; and as an MP he has been strongly anti-nuclear, pro sustainable population, and pro-action on climate change. In 2011 and 2012 he was prominent in leading opposition inside the Australian Federal Parliament to the export of live cattle and sheep for meat. In October 2012, Thomson's call for a ban on political donations by developers received backing from the Melbourne Age. In 2012 he voted against the Marriage Equality Amendment Bill. In 2017 he was awarded the Alan Missen Award for Integrity in Serving Parliament by the Accountability Roundtable.

In 2012 Emeritus Professor Ian Lowe, president of the Australian Conservation Foundation, examined Labor's views on population and environment in his book Bigger or Better? Lowe found Labor's stated and de facto population policies, like those of the Liberal Party, to be confused and inconsistent. Lowe argued that these were distorted by a pro-growth ideology that was in conflict with the evidence, and by a failure to understand the infrastructure costs of rapid population growth. By contrast he discussed and commended the arguments in four separate papers by Thomson, noting that collectively these proved that "Thomson is not a 'one-trick pony' obsessed with population to the exclusion of other important issues, but a politician who is thinking deeply about our security and ways to ensure a better future". Lowe also expressed surprise that so much had been made of "Thomson's anodyne reference" for Mokbel, given that Thomson had done "what most MP's do quite routinely, writing a reference for a constituent".

During his time in Parliament, Thomson spoke out against criminal activities in the gambling industry.

Political theorist
Since 2008 Thomson has emerged as a political theorist, whose speeches and articles question some of the Labor Party's current directions and call for reforms.

His analysis begins by noting the exceptional speed of Australia's population growth since 2000. On this he cites the demographer Graeme Hugo who has described it as more than three times the average annual increase of industrialised countries.  In a series of papers and speeches collected on his website, Thomson argues that such rapid growth imposes high costs upon government budgets, upon natural and urban environments, and upon citizens' finances and lifestyle. Thomson concedes that Labor will not quickly change its pro-growth stance or embrace "population reform", but argues that there is no other solution because the rate of population growth is impoverishing State governments and leading to widespread discontent among voters.

Answering those who imagine Labor could solve this problem by better planning or by allocating more funds, Thomson suggests they do not understand the crippling effect of the infrastructure costs imposed by population growth. On this, he cites the work of US economist Lester Thurow and University of Queensland agricultural economist Jane N. O'Sullivan. O'Sullivan has argued that these costs, amounting to some A$200,000 of infrastructure per extra Australian, dwarf the supposed economic advantages. Thomson believes this largely explains why Anna Bligh's seemingly competent Queensland State government suffered the worst defeat of a sitting government in Queensland history, when it was forced to alienate voters by selling off public assets even during an economic boom, and yet could not satisfy the population's demand for infrastructure. He suggests that, "Instead of talking about population size, we should examine the economic impacts of ... population growth rate."

In a speech in Parliament in March 2012 he recommended to his colleagues a paper by O'Sullivan in Economic Affairs as crucial reading "for anyone who seriously wants to understand ...why governments of all persuasions struggle to meet people's needs and expectations." Thomson argued that since about 2% of existing infrastructure comes up for renewal each year, and this is a cost governments struggle to pay, a mere 1% annual increase in population may impose an almost unpayable increase of up to 50% in infrastructure costs:

A society with a stable population needs to replace two per cent of all infrastructure annually. But if a population is growing at one per cent per annum, for example ...this increases the burden of infrastructure creation by some 50 per cent. ...One per cent more GDP or tax cannot pay for 25 to 50 per cent more public infrastructure. 

Thomson had already generalized this analysis in his August 2011 paper The Witches’ Hats Theory of Government: How increasing population is making the task of government harder. Here Thomson suggested that one reason many politicians around the world imposed policies to promote population growth was that they did not realize how likely it was to shorten their own political longevity. He assembled evidence suggesting that worldwide there is an inverse statistical connection between population growth and how long a given government is likely to last.

Retirement from politics
On 10 November 2015, Thomson announced he would retire from politics at the 2016 federal election. He held his seat of Wills between 1996 and 2016, and was succeeded in the seat by Peter Khalil. In December 2016 he announced that he was joining the Alliance for Gambling Reform as a campaign manager.

In January 2019, Thomson joined Sustainable Australia as an advisor to MLC Clifford Hayes.

Publications
 Labor Essays 1983 - Policies and Programs for the Labor Government, Drummond, Richmond Victoria, 1983. (co-editor)
 “The Role of Fiduciary Duty in Safeguarding the Future”, in Fiduciary Duty and the Atmospheric Trust, eds. Ken Coghill,  Charles Sampford and Tim Smith, 2012.
 "Why can’t we win on population?”, in Sustainable Futures - Linking population, resources and the environment, eds. Jennie Goldie and Katharine Betts, 2014.
 "The decline of wildlife in Australia in Global Viewpoints - Biodiversity and Conservation, ed. Lisa Idzikowski, 2020.

References

External links
 

|-

|-

|-

1955 births
Living people
Politicians from Melbourne
Australian Labor Party members of the Parliament of Australia
Labor Right politicians
Members of the Australian House of Representatives
Members of the Australian House of Representatives for Wills
Members of the Victorian Legislative Assembly
21st-century Australian politicians
20th-century Australian politicians
People educated at Penleigh and Essendon Grammar School
People from Coburg, Victoria